Ntomba and Lia (Bolia) are closely related Bantu languages of the Democratic Republic of the Congo, close enough to be considered dialects of a single Lia-Ntomba language.

The related Mongo language also has varieties called Ntomba or Ntumba.

References

Bangi-Ntomba languages
Languages of the Democratic Republic of the Congo